KCRS (550 AM), commonly called Newstalk 550 KCRS, is a radio station broadcasting a News Talk Information format. Licensed to Midland, Texas, United States, the station serves the Odessa-Midland area.  The station is currently owned by ICA Radio Midland-Odessa License, LLC and features programming from Fox News Radio, Premiere Radio Networks and Sporting News Radio. KCRS also carries live sports for the Permian Basin. Currently the station carries the games of the Midland RockHounds of Minor League Baseball's Texas League as well as football broadcasts for the Midland High Bulldogs and the Legacy High Rebels on a rotating basis with Lonestar 92.

KCRS' studios are located at the ICA Business Plaza on East Eighth Street in Odessa, just east of downtown, and its transmitter is located in Midland.

KCRS was the leader in sports in West Texas for a time. It was the home of Sports Fan Radio Network and aired the Fabulous Sports Babe program. Until the 2009 season, KCRS was the flagship station for the RockHounds, having been their radio home since the team was first established as the Midland Cubs back in 1972. In the spring of 2009, GAP Broadcasting announced that the Rockhound games would be following OC over to 102.1 Jack FM. From 2004 to 2007 NewsTalk 550 was the affiliate for Odessa College men's and women's road basketball games, but those rights were transferred to KFZX in 2008. Before getting the OC contract, they aired 10 consecutive years of NJCAA Conference play with Midland College for both men's and women's basketball. They have also been the home for the NCAA Texas Tech Red Raiders football and men's basketball games, but the rights were moved to KMCM in 2004. They broadcast NCAA Baylor Bears football games from 1978 until 2004, when they decided to drop NCAA games altogether.

KCRS was owned by Clear Channel Communications until it sold the entire Midland-Odessa cluster to Gap Broadcasting, who in turn sold the said cluster to ICA Broadcasting for $3 million.

FM Translators
KCRS relays its programming to two FM translators in order to widen the coverage area; they also provide the listener with the choice of listening on FM with high fidelity stereophonic sound.

Station schedule
Monday–Friday

4am – Gordon Deal This Morning
6am – The Morning Drive
9am – The Lynn Woolley Show
11am – Rush Limbaugh
2pm – Dave Ramsey
5pm – The 5 O'Clock News Block with Jesse Grimes
6pm – Lars Larson
9pm – Hugh Hewitt (delayed)
12am – Coast to Coast AM with George Noory

References

External links

CRS
News and talk radio stations in the United States
Radio stations established in 1972